Bart Marshall Millard (born December 1, 1972) is an American singer and songwriter who is best known as the leader of the band MercyMe. He has also released two solo albums: Hymned, No. 1, in 2005 and Hymned Again in 2008. He received a solo Grammy nomination in the category of Best Southern, Country, or Bluegrass Gospel Album for the latter album.

Band career
In high school, Millard wanted to become a football player, a dream which ended when he injured both ankles at a high school football game. As a result, Millard took choir as an elective. Millard's father, Arthur Wesley Millard Jr., died in 1991, during Bart's first year of college, and his youth pastor invited him to work with the church's youth group worship band. Millard accepted and worked with the video and audio systems for the group. James (Jim) Bryson played piano for that band and later went on to play with Bart Millard and the worship band on a trip to Switzerland. This trip inspired Millard to pursue a full-time musical career. Millard and two of his friends, James Phillip Bryson and Michael John Scheuchzer, moved to Oklahoma City, and formed MercyMe. Since then, the band has recorded six independent, ten studio, two Christmas, and three compilation albums.

Solo career
Millard made a promise to his grandmother to record an album of hymns before she died, which he did with Hymned No. 1, and he subsequently shared the story of how he was inspired by his grandmother's faith. Millard made the second of his two hymn albums because he realized that the church he was attending did not sing hymns and he wanted his children to have hymns as a part of their lives.

Millard said his dad heavily influenced him in his musical direction with respect to the hymn albums, drawing particularly on Willie Nelson and Louie Prima.  Millard stated that these influences would not be appropriate for MercyMe, as MercyMe is similar to Coldplay, while these hymns are more in the vein of Frank Sinatra.  Millard said that he embarked on his solo effort in order to give expression to musical styles that would not have been compatible with MercyMe.  Millard said that they sang a Hank Williams song called "I Saw the Light" in his church growing up.

The title of Hymned Again is a "tongue-in-cheek" reference to the first album.  The first album was an effort to make songs that he did not particularly care about cooler, and the second album was created to achieve a Kansas City swing/shuffle mood in the vein of Louie Prima, Harry Connick Jr. and Jamie Cullum, which is what was achieved.  According to Greer, this album was very reminiscent of She by Connick, which was done five or six times according to Millard.  Millard said he accomplished this by listening to a stack of albums by these musicians.  Millard said the songs on the album Hymned Again are in the tradition of the Great Revival era musically, but that this was not done on purpose.  Millard said the one original song on the album, entitled "Jesus Cares for Me", was written by Thad Cockrell, a song that, according to the singer, "could’ve been written 50, 60 years ago."  Millard nervously asked Vince Gill to participate on the album. On the possibility of a future "Hymned" effort, Millard said, "Man, I hope so."

Millard is featured as a vocalist on "I See Love," a 2004 single by Third Day and Steven Curtis Chapman. He is also featured as a backing vocalist on Phil Wickham's 2009 single "Safe."

Awards 
Millard was called the Best Male Vocalist by Christianity Today in 2005, for his work on his solo album Hymned No. 1 and for The Christmas Sessions album with his band MercyMe.  Millard's Hymned No. 1 was called the No. 9 best album of the year by Christianity Today in 2005.

Film 
Millard's song "I Can Only Imagine" was inspired by his father's death, and was made into a film also titled I Can Only Imagine. The film was released on March 16, 2018.

Personal life 
Millard is from Greenville, Texas. He and his wife Shannon have five children: Sam, Gracie, Charlie, Sophie and Miles.

Discography

Albums

Guest appearances

References

External links 
 

1972 births
American performers of Christian music
American rock singers
Fair Trade Services artists
Living people
Singers from Texas
People from Greenville, Texas
Songwriters from Texas
21st-century American singers
21st-century American male singers
American male songwriters